The Rover Scarab was a convertible four seater intended to sell at £85, and had a V twin engine of only 839 cc, which was rear mounted. Despite the engine position, the Scarab had a conventional (dummy) radiator grill at the front. Some other 1930s rear engined cars had a down-curved grill-less front. These included the Porsche Typ 12 prototype, the Mercedes-Benz 120 test car, and the subsequent 130 / 150 / 170 H, the Tatra V570 prototype, T77, 77A, T87 and T97 and of course the KdF-Wagen (later better known as the Volkswagen Beetle; see Volkswagen controversy). Only a few Scarabs were built, examples being shown at the London (Olympia) Motor Show and the Scottish Motor Show, both in 1931.

References
https://web.archive.org/web/20120722081518/http://www.carkeys.co.uk/features/five-million-rovers-and-more
http://www.motorbase.com/vehicle/by-id/-1561926686/index.ehtml

Scarab

1930s cars

Rear-engined vehicles